The women's football tournament at the 2021 Southeast Asian Games was held from 6–22 May 2022 in Vietnam. Seven Southeast Asian nations participated in the women's tournament. All matches were played in Quảng Ninh. There was no age limit for this tournament. Indonesia withdrew from the competition after the draw. Malaysia withdrew from the competition before the draw. Timor-Leste did not take part in the competition.

Vietnam won the tournament for the third time in a row, and the seventh time in total, successfully defending their titles in 2017 and 2019, by beating Thailand 1–0 in the final.

Competition schedule
The following is the competition schedule for the women's football competition:

Venues

Participating nations

 
  
 
 
 
 
 
 

On 15 April 2022, Indonesia announced that they will withdraw from the tournament.

Draw
The draw for the tournament will be held on 6 April 2022. 8 teams were seeded into 3 pots based on their performance in the previous two editions. The host, also the two time defending champion, Vietnam was automatically assigned into position A1. Thailand, as the runners-up in both of the previous two editions, was assigned into position B1.

On 15 April 2022, Indonesia announced that they will withdraw from the tournament.

Squads

Unlike the men's tournament which is an under-23 international tournament, the women's football tournament is for senior national teams.

Group stage

Group A

Group B

Knockout stage

Semi-finals

Bronze medal match

Gold medal match

Winners

Goalscorers

Final ranking

See also
Football at the 2021 Southeast Asian Games - Men's tournament
Futsal at the 2021 Southeast Asian Games - Women's tournament

Notes

References

Football at the 2021 Southeast Asian Games
2022 in women's association football
2020s in Asian women's sport
International women's association football competitions hosted by Vietnam